The British Rail Class 115 diesel multiple units were 41 high-density sets which operated the outer-suburban services from Marylebone usually to destinations such as High Wycombe, Aylesbury and Banbury which are on the Chiltern Main Line and Great Central Main Line (now the London to Aylesbury Line). Sometimes, these sets used to operate 8- or 12-car-long expresses to Nottingham Victoria in the final years of the GCML. Coincidentally, Class 115 units operated services under Table 115 in the British Rail timetable.

Construction and service
Based on the basic Derby high density design, the sets are similar to Class 127 but were internally superior as the class had larger windows, better furnishings, lighting and wall surfaces.

Six sets were also built for the Cheshire Lines Committee (CLC) line between Liverpool and Manchester, where in 1960 they replaced steam haulage on the limited stop services via Warrington. These units lasted on the CLC until the mid-1980s when the principal services on that line became locomotive-hauled once again using Class 31 diesels. The CLC units were then transferred to join the identical ones at Marylebone. 

Class 115 units also worked from Tyseley in the later years.

The Marylebone sets, which were later transferred to Bletchley but remained on Chiltern Line duties (and finally to Old Oak Common), were declared surplus after the introduction of Class 165s, from 1991 onwards. While at Bletchley and Old Oak Common depots the class found use on the Gospel Oak to Barking Line, units being formed as power twins.  They were, in turn, replaced on this line by Class 117 power twins, displaced from Paddington suburban duties.

The final class 115 working out of Marylebone was on 29 July 1992. The Tyseley vehicles survived a bit longer, until February 1994.

Some of the class briefly found their way on to the Redhill to Tonbridge Line to replace ageing DEMU sets.  The line was electrified in 1993, in order to allow a diversionary route for the Eurostar, and the class 115s were replaced initially with Class 411 EMUs, then ex-Merseyrail Class 508 EMUs in 1998 (after privatisation).

Accidents and incidents

On 11 December 1981, two four-car Class 115 units were involved in a collision between Gerrards Cross and Seer Green. The driver of an empty stock train, traveling from Marylebone to Princes Risborough, had stopped in the cutting between Gerrards Cross and Seer Green, to clear tree branches that were overhanging and had fallen onto the track, due to very heavy snow fall. Behind the empty stock train, a passenger train travelling from Marylebone to Banbury, was, incorrectly, authorised to pass a signal at danger at Gerrards Cross, entering the same section of track and partially telescoped the stationary train. Four people were killed, including the driver of the passenger train, and five others were seriously injured.

Technical details

 Builder: BR Derby
 Introduced: 1960
 Coupling Code: Blue Square
 Body:  × 
 Transmission: Standard mechanical
 Weight: DMBS ; TCL ; TS

Preservation

15 vehicles are preserved. DMBS 51677 was scrapped in early 2017.

References

The Railcar Association
Motive Power Recognition: 3 DMUs. Colin J. Marsden
British Railway Pictorial: First Generation DMUs.  Kevin Robertson
British Rail Fleet Survey 8: Diesel Multiple Units- The First Generation.  Brian Haresnape
A Pictorial Record of British Railways Diesel Multiple Units.  Brian Golding

115
Train-related introductions in 1960